Deco Vs. Deco is the second DVD released by the Japanese rock band Maximum the Hormone on March 19, 2008. The DVD contains live performances, music videos and more extras. The RIAJ certified the DVD Gold selling more than 100,000 copies.

Track listing
Live footage
 "What's Up, People?!"
 ""
 ""
 "" 
 ""
 ""
 ""
 ""
 ""
 ""
 ""
 ""
 "Falling Jimmy" 
 "Rolling 1000toon"
 ""
 ""
 "
 "Credits ( as background)"

Music videos
 "What's Up, People?!"
 ""
 ""
 ""
 ""

Bonus footage
Deco Vs Deco includes a documentary about the tour, recording at the studio, making of the music videos, "2nd Ryo Challenge" and the "Documentary Inferno".

References

Maximum the Hormone albums
2008 video albums